Lee Jung-min(Korean:이정민) (born 13 November 1990) is a South Korean Paralympic judoka. He represented South Korea at the 2016 Summer Paralympics held in Rio de Janeiro, Brazil and he won the silver medal in the men's 81 kg event.

In 2018, he represented South Korea at the Asian Para Games held in Jakarta, Indonesia and he won the gold medal in the men's 81 kg event. He also won the gold medal in the men's team event.

References

External links 
 

Living people
1990 births
Place of birth missing (living people)
South Korean male judoka
Judoka at the 2016 Summer Paralympics
Medalists at the 2016 Summer Paralympics
Paralympic silver medalists for South Korea
Paralympic medalists in judo
Paralympic judoka of South Korea
20th-century South Korean people
21st-century South Korean people